Jean-Claude Adrimer Bozga  (born 1 June 1984) is a Romanian former professional footballer who played as a centre-back.

Career
Bozga moved to Vestsjælland in February 2013 after a successful trial. He won promotion to the Danish Superliga in his first season at the club. Bozga formed a partnership in central defense with Lasse Nielsen, and the duo allowed the fewest goals on headers of all Superliga-clubs early on in the season. After the club suffered relegation and later filed for bankruptcy in December 2015, Bozga signed with K-League club Daejeon Citizen from the K League 2.

On 30 June 2017, Bozga returned to Denmark where he signed with HB Køge after a successful trial. He signed a contract extension in December 2019, keeping him at the club until 2020.

Bozga moved to Ishøj IF in the Denmark Series on 29 July 2020. After six months, he returned to Slagelse B&I, the continuation of the bankrupt Vestsjælland.

In June 2022, Bozga announced his retirement from football. He founded his own company after retiring from professional football, J.C Bozga Construct ApS, which deals with renovation tasks, painting and masonry work.

Honours
Petrolul Ploiești
Liga II: 2010–11

Personal life 
Bozga was born in Galați to a Romanian mother and a Congolese father who studied in Romania.

References

External links

1984 births
Living people
Romanian people of Democratic Republic of the Congo descent
Romanian footballers
Association football defenders
CS Concordia Chiajna players
Liga I players
Liga II players
Belarusian Premier League players
Danish Superliga players
Danish 2nd Division players
K League 2 players
FCM Dunărea Galați players
FC Petrolul Ploiești players
FC Minsk players
FC Vestsjælland players
Daejeon Hana Citizen FC players
HB Køge players
Romanian expatriate footballers
Expatriate footballers in Belarus
Romanian expatriate sportspeople in Belarus
Expatriate men's footballers in Denmark
Romanian expatriate sportspeople in Denmark
Expatriate footballers in South Korea
Ishøj IF players
Sportspeople from Galați